Mack Calvin (born July 27, 1947) is an American former basketball player. A five-time ABA All-Star, Calvin recorded the second most assists in ABA history, and was later named to the ABA All-Time Team.

High school career
Calvin was born in Fort Worth, Texas and attended Long Beach Poly in California.

College career
A 6'0" point guard from Long Beach City College and the University of Southern California, Calvin was a 14th-round draft pick of the NBA's Los Angeles Lakers in 1969.

In his final college season, Calvin and his Trojans defeated the UCLA Bruins, 46–44, in Pauley Pavilion, ending several of the Bruins' consecutive win streaks: 17 straight over USC, 41 in a row overall, 45 consecutive in Pacific-8 Conference play, and 51 straight at Pauley.

Professional career
He played seven seasons (1969–1976) in the now-defunct American Basketball Association (ABA) and four seasons in the National Basketball Association (NBA).

Calvin began his professional career with the ABA's Los Angeles Stars, averaging 16.8 points per game in his first regular season to make the ABA All-Rookie Team. Despite finishing 43-41, in the 1970 ABA Playoffs Calvin, George Stone, and Craig Raymond, helped the Stars make an unexpected trip to the ABA Finals. On the way there, during a win over the Dallas Chaparrals in the division semifinals, Mack scored a postseason career high 44 points, while adding 16 assists. In the finals, Calvin averaged 15.8 points and 5 assists per game during a 4-2 series loss to Roger Brown and the Indiana Pacers. The following season, he averaged a career-high 27.2 points for The Floridians, in the process setting the ABA records for most free throws made (696) and most free throws attempted (805) in one season. During the 1974-75 ABA season, Calvin helped the Nuggets to a 65-19 record by averaging 7.7 assists per game, both of which were best in the league. However, in the Western Division Finals, Denver was eliminated by Indiana in a seven game series. In 1976, Calvin played while also briefly coaching the Squires. In total during his ABA career, Calvin tallied 10,620 points and 3,067 assists (second in ABA history behind only Louie Dampier's 4,044) and appeared in 5 All-Star games.

Calvin joined the Lakers for the 1976–77 NBA season but saw a sharp decline in playing time.  He was able to match the same level of production per minute he reached while in the ABA, though.  He spent his four seasons in the NBA with five teams—the Lakers, the San Antonio Spurs, the Denver Nuggets (which had joined the NBA in 1976), the Utah Jazz, and the Cleveland Cavaliers. In the 1978 NBA Playoffs, during his second Denver tenure, Calvin and the Nuggets made it to the Western Conference Finals, before being eliminated by the Seattle SuperSonics. Calvin retired in 1981 with an NBA career scoring-average of 7.0 points per game.

Coaching career
He coached Virginia Squires in the ABA (1975–76) for six games and Los Angeles Clippers in the NBA (1991–92, as an interim head coach in February 1992 for two games).

References

External links
 

1947 births
Living people
African-American basketball players
American men's basketball players
Basketball coaches from Texas
Basketball players from Texas
Carolina Cougars players
Cleveland Cavaliers players
Continental Basketball Association coaches
Denver Nuggets players
Long Beach City Vikings men's basketball players
Los Angeles Clippers head coaches
Los Angeles Lakers draft picks
Los Angeles Lakers players
Los Angeles Stars draft picks
Los Angeles Stars players
Miami Floridians players
Point guards
San Antonio Spurs players
Sportspeople from Fort Worth, Texas
USC Trojans men's basketball players
Utah Jazz players
Virginia Squires coaches
Virginia Squires players
21st-century African-American people
20th-century African-American sportspeople
Long Beach Polytechnic High School alumni